So Wa Wai (born 6 October 1981) is a retired athlete from Hong Kong who has competed in the Paralympic Games on five occasions, winning 12 medals. So Wa Wai is called the "Wonder Boy" by the people in Hong Kong.

Early life 

So was born with jaundice which affected both his hearing and the balance of his limbs, and hence competes in the T36 classification for athletes with cerebral palsy. At the age of 10, his enthusiasm for running was noticed by athletics coach Poon Kin-lui, who then began to formally train So.

Paralympic career 

His first Paralympic appearance came at the 1996 games in Atlanta, where he won a gold medal as part of the men's 4×100 m relay team in the T34-37 classification.

Over the course of the next two summer Paralympic Games, 2000 in Sydney and 2004 in Athens, So won four gold and two silver medals in a range of individual events, up to a distance of 400 m, as well as two bronze medals in relay events.

In 2008 So was chosen to be part of the torch relay as the Olympic flame passed through Hong Kong on its way to Beijing. However, his participation in the games themselves was put into doubt when an injury to his father rendered him unable to work. So was forced to give up his training and take up a full-time job to support his family. Help with his situation came from Andy Lau, a Hong Kong entertainer and the singer of the Beijing Paralympic Games official theme song "Flying with the Dream", who gave him a full-time job with the flexibility to allow him to train for the Games.

At the 2008 Summer Paralympics games, So led the Hong Kong team into the Bird's Nest Stadium during the opening ceremony as the flagbearer. During competition he first won a bronze medal in the 100 m, a performance with which he was disappointed, and followed this with a sixth place in the 400 m. In the 200 m T36 final he broke his own world record with a time of 24.64 seconds on the way to winning the gold medal, making him the Paralympic champion in that event for the third successive occasion. After the race he said he had been ill before the competition and that "During the first part of today's competition I did not run at my normal speed", he attributed his win to both "good luck" and "practice".

So announced the news of his retirement from athletics in January 2016.

So is the current world record holder in both the 100 and 200 m men's T36 classification.

Related film 
In 2021, So's story was adopted into the film Zero to Hero, starring Sandra Ng and Leung Chung-hang.

See also
 Hong Kong at the 2008 Summer Paralympics

References

External links
 

1981 births
Living people
Hong Kong male sprinters
Paralympic gold medalists for Hong Kong
Paralympic silver medalists for Hong Kong
Paralympic bronze medalists for Hong Kong
Paralympic athletes of Hong Kong
Paralympic medalists in athletics (track and field)
Track and field athletes with cerebral palsy
World record holders in Paralympic athletics
Athletes (track and field) at the 1996 Summer Paralympics
Athletes (track and field) at the 2000 Summer Paralympics
Athletes (track and field) at the 2004 Summer Paralympics
Athletes (track and field) at the 2008 Summer Paralympics
Athletes (track and field) at the 2012 Summer Paralympics
Medalists at the 1996 Summer Paralympics
Medalists at the 2000 Summer Paralympics
Medalists at the 2004 Summer Paralympics
Medalists at the 2008 Summer Paralympics
Medalists at the 2012 Summer Paralympics
Medalists at the 2010 Asian Para Games